Roșia de Secaș is a commune located in Alba County, Transylvania, Romania. It has a population of 1,696 and is composed of three villages: Roșia de Secaș, Tău (Székástóhát) and Ungurei (Gergelyfája).

References

Communes in Alba County
Localities in Transylvania